Rebecca "Beckie" Jane Brown (born 4 December 1992 in Chelmsford, Essex, England) is an English vlogger, artist and YouTube personality. She has been active on YouTube since 2006 when she started videoblogging at the age of 13, under the name Beckie0. She attended MET film school from 2012 to 2014.  In 2008, Beckie started posting content about her disorder, trichotillomania. In 2011, Beckie Jane Brown was nominated for Mind's Digital Media Award for her online work, and won The Speaking Out Award. She has appeared on the BBC to discuss trichotillomania, and her most popular video to date is a montage of photos of her face which she has taken daily since the age of 14. She spoke out against YouTube's decision to change their monetisation criteria in January 2018.

References

External links
 Personal YouTube Channel (Beckie0)
 Trichotillomania YouTube Channel (TrichJournal)

1992 births
Living people
People from Chelmsford